Grafton Glenard Smith (April 25, 1895 – October 6, 1949) was a Canadian ice hockey player who played nine games in the National Hockey League during the 1921–22 season for the Toronto St. Pats, and won the Stanley Cup with the team. The rest of his career, which lasted from 1915 to 1922, was spent in the Ontario Hockey Association senior league. Born in Meaford, Ontario, Smith played junior hockey in Woodstock from 1910 to 1914, when he left to military service. After his return, he played senior hockey in Toronto until 1921. After his hockey career ended, he retired to the township of East York, in Ontario.

In 1949, Glenn Smith died suddenly at St. Michael's Hospital in Toronto. He was buried October 13, 1949 at Mount Hope Cemetery in Toronto. He had been an editor and publisher of a magazine in the final years of his life.

Career statistics

Regular season and playoffs

Sources:

References

External links

1895 births
1949 deaths
Canadian ice hockey defencemen
Canadian military personnel of World War I
Ice hockey people from Ontario
Ontario Hockey Association Senior A League (1890–1979) players
People from Grey County
Toronto St. Pats players